The Battle of Komarow (known in Russia as the Battle of Tomaszów) was a battle on the Eastern Front during World War I. It would prove a victory for the Austro-Hungarian forces, but one they would not be able to reproduce in the coming months of the war.

Background 

In pre-war planning, on 2 August, Helmuth von Moltke the Younger wrote Franz Graf Conrad von Hötzendorf, "The German army corps marching on Kalisz-Czenstochau will in any case begin an advance on Radom-Nowo-Alexandriya via Kalisz-Czenstochau on the 12th day of mobilisation.  The commander of the corps is ordered to advance relentlessly into Russia and to join up with the left flank of the leftmost Austrian army."  Accouring to Prit Buttar, "...Conrad was keen to take the offensive and needed little urging. He had repeatedly shared with his German counterpart the concept of a huge pincer operation to isolate the Russian salient west of Warsaw."

The Austro-Hungarian armies under Conrad's command included Dankl's First Army, east of Sandomierz, with the I, V, and X Corps of 10 infantry divisions, 2 cavalry divisions, and an infantry brigade. North of Przemyśl was Auffenberg's Fourth Army, with the II, VI, IX, and XVII Corps of 9 infantry divisions, and 2 cavalry divisions.  East of Przemyśl was Brudermann's Third Army, with the III, XI and XIV Corps of 18 infantry divisions and 4 cavalry divisions. Heinrich Rittmeister Kummer von Falkenfeld commanded an Army Group on the western flank, with 2 infantry and 1 cavalry divisions.  Kövess commanded an Army Group on the eastern flank, consisting of XII Corps, with the Second Army, commanded by Eduard von Böhm-Ermolli.

The Russian Southwestern Front was under the command of Nikolai Iudovich Ivanov.  His forces included Saltza's Fourth Army with the Grenadier Corps, XIV and XVI Corps of 6 infantry divisions, 3 cavalry divisions, plus an infantry and cavalry brigade.  To the east was Plehve's  Fifth Army, with the V, XVII, XIX and XXV Corps of 10 infantry and 5 cavalry divisions.  Further east was Nikolai Ruzsky's Third Army with the IX, X, XI, and XXI Corps of 12 infantry and 4 cavalry divisions.  On the Russian eastern flanks was Aleksei Brusilov's Eighth Army with the VII, VIII, XII and XXIV Corps of 10 infantry and 5 cavalry divisions.  

Following the Battle of Kraśnik, Dankl's First Army had forced the Russian Fourth Army to retreat towards Lublin. As a counterattack, Plehve's Russian Fifth Army attempted to turn the Austro-Hungarian eastern flank.  Plehve's XIX, V, and XVII advanced along the River Bug, while his XXV Corps was to the west.

Battle 
On 26 August, the Russian XXV Corps came under attack by the Dankl's First Army X Corps,  and Auffenberg's Fourth Army II Corps.  After reaching Zamość, the Russians corps had to retreat to Krasnostaw.  In the meantime, Plehve's XVII Corps reached Sokol, while his XIX and V Corps advanced southwest.  On 27 August, Archduke Joseph Ferdinand of Austria's XIV Corps, with 4 infantry divisions, guarded the Austrian-Hungarian eastern flank, right of the XVII corps, while the VI Corps faced the Russian XVII and V Corps.  Little was achieved on either side after two days of fighting, other than a reduction in fighting strength of the Russian XXV Corps.  On 28 August, the Austro-Hungarian XVII Corps attacked the eastern flank of the Russian V Corps, disrupting its attack.  Similarly, the archduke's corps attacked the rear of the Russian XVII Corps, who retreated in disarray by the end of the day.  On 29 August, the Austro-Hungarian II Corps advanced eastwards from Zamość, while the archduke's corps advanced to Hulkze.  On 30 August, Dankl's First Army X Corps occupied Krasnostaw.

Aftermath 
Short of supplies, and exhausted after days of fighting, Auffenberg was unable to pursue the retreating Russians.  According to Brit Puttar, "The victory at Komarów was incomplete, inasmuch as Plehve escaped being encircled and thus saved much of his army, but his losses were considerable. The Austro-Hungarians took over 20,000 prisoners, and captured 150 guns. But the battlefield losses of both sides were heavy."

References

Additional Reading
 Nikolai Golovin. Great battle for Galicia 

Battles of World War I involving Austria-Hungary
Battles of World War I involving Russia
Battles of the Eastern Front (World War I)
Battle of Komarow 1914
1914 in the Russian Empire
Kholm Governorate